Eagles Nest Airport may refer to:
 Eagles Nest Airport (New Jersey) in West Creek, New Jersey, USA
 Eagles Nest Airport (North Carolina) in Potters Hill, North Carolina, USA
 Eagle Nest Ranch Airport in Estacada, Oregon, USA
 Eagle's Nest Airport (Virginia) in Waynesboro, Virginia, USA

See also
 Nest of Eagles Airport, an airport in Spooner, Wisconsin, USA
 US Park Police Eagle's Nest Heliport, a heliport in Washington, D.C., USA